Ilave, also known as Illawi, is the capital city of the Ilave District in El Collao Province, in the Puno Region of Peru. According to the projection of the 2012 census, it has 57,366 inhabitants. It is located on the Ilave River and west from Lake Titicaca.

See also
 Ilave River

References

Populated places in the Puno Region